Liberia, officially the Republic of Liberia, is a country on the West African coast. It is bordered by Sierra Leone to its northwest, Guinea to its north, Ivory Coast to its east, and the Atlantic Ocean to its south and southwest. English is the official language, but over 20 indigenous languages are spoken, reflecting the country's ethnic and cultural diversity. The country's capital and largest city is Monrovia.

Liberia began in the early 19th century as a project of the American Colonization Society (ACS), which believed black people would face better chances for freedom and prosperity in Africa than in the United States. Between 1822 and the outbreak of the American Civil War in 1861, more than 15,000 freed and free-born black people who faced social and legal oppression in the U.S., along with 3,198 Afro-Caribbeans, relocated to Liberia. Gradually developing an Americo-Liberian identity,  the settlers carried their culture and tradition with them; the Liberian constitution and flag were modeled after those of the U.S., while its capital was named after ACS supporter and U.S. President James Monroe. Liberia declared independence on July 26, 1847, which the U.S. did not recognize until February 5, 1862. On January 3, 1848, Joseph Jenkins Roberts, a wealthy, free-born African American from the U.S. state of Virginia who settled in Liberia, was elected Liberia's first president after the people proclaimed independence.

Liberia was the first African republic to proclaim its independence and is Africa's first and oldest modern republic. It was among the few African countries to maintain its sovereignty during the Scramble for Africa. During World War II, Liberia supported the United States war effort against Germany, and in turn received considerable American investment in infrastructure, which aided the country's wealth and development. President William Tubman encouraged economic and political changes that heightened the country's prosperity and international profile; Liberia was a founding member of the League of Nations, United Nations, and the Organisation of African Unity.

The Americo-Liberian settlers did not relate well to the indigenous peoples they encountered, especially those living in the more isolated interior. Colonial settlements were raided by the Kru and Grebo from their inland chiefdoms. Americo-Liberians promoted religious organizations to set up missions and schools to educate the native populace. Americo-Liberians formed into a small elite that held disproportionate political power; indigenous Africans were excluded from birthright citizenship in their own land until 1904.

In 1980, political tensions from the rule of William R. Tolbert resulted in a military coup during which Tolbert was killed, marking the end of Americo-Liberian rule in the country and beginning over two decades of political instability. Five years of military rule by the People's Redemption Council and five years of civilian rule by the National Democratic Party of Liberia were followed by the First and Second Liberian Civil Wars. These resulted in the deaths of 250,000 people (about 8% of the population) and the displacement of many more, with Liberia's economy shrinking by 90%. A peace agreement in 2003 led to democratic elections in 2005, in which Ellen Johnson Sirleaf was elected president, making history as the first female president on the continent. National infrastructure and basic social services were severely affected by the conflicts as well as by the 2013–2016 outbreak of Ebola virus, with 83% of the population living below the international poverty line as of 2015.

History

Indigenous people
The presence of Oldowan Earlier Stone Age (earliest ESA) artifacts in West Africa has been confirmed by Michael Omolewa, attesting to the presence of ancient humans.

Undated Acheulean (ESA) artifacts are well documented across West Africa. The emerging chronometric record of the Middle Stone Age (MSA) indicates that core and flake technologies have been present in West Africa since at least the Chibanian (~780–126 thousand years ago or ka) in northern, open Sahelian zones, and that they persisted until the Terminal Pleistocene/Holocene boundary (~12ka) in both northern and southern zones of West Africa. This makes them the youngest examples of such MSA technology anywhere in Africa. The presence of MSA populations in forests remains an open question; however technological differences may correlate with various ecological zones. Later Stone Age (LSA) populations evidence significant technological diversification, including both microlithic and macrolithic traditions.

The record shows that aceramic and ceramic Later Stone Age (LSA) assemblages in West Africa overlap chronologically, and that changing densities of microlithic industries from the coast to the north are geographically structured. These features may represent social networks or some form of cultural diffusion allied to changing ecological conditions.

Microlithic industries with ceramics became common by the Mid-Holocene, coupled with an apparent intensification of wild food exploitation. Between ~4–3.5ka, these societies gradually transformed into food producers, possibly through contact with northern pastoralists and agriculturalists, as the environment became more arid. However, hunter-gatherers have survived in the more forested parts of West Africa until much later, attesting to the strength of ecological boundaries in this region.

Mande expansion
The Pepper Coast, also known as the Grain Coast, has been inhabited by indigenous peoples of Africa at least as far back as the 12th century. Mande-speaking people expanded westward from the Sudan, forcing many smaller ethnic groups southward toward the Atlantic Ocean. The Dei, Bassa, Kru, Gola, and Kissi were some of the earliest documented peoples in the area.

This influx of these groups was compounded by the decline of the Western Sudanic Mali Empire in 1375 and the Songhai Empire in 1591. As inland regions underwent desertification, inhabitants moved to the wetter coast. These new inhabitants brought skills such as cotton spinning, cloth weaving, iron smelting, rice and sorghum cultivation, and social and political institutions from the Mali and Songhai empires. Shortly after the Mane conquered the region, the Vai people of the former Mali Empire immigrated into the Grand Cape Mount County region. The ethnic Kru opposed the influx of Vai, forming an alliance with the Mane to stop further influx of Vai.

People along the coast built canoes and traded with other West Africans from Cap-Vert to the Gold Coast.

Early colonization
Between 1461 and the late 17th century, Portuguese, Dutch, and British traders had contacts and trading posts in the region. The Portuguese named the area Costa da Pimenta ("Pepper Coast") but it later came to be known as the Grain Coast, due to the abundance of melegueta pepper grains. European traders would barter commodities and goods with local people.

In the United States, there was a movement to settle free people of color, both free-born and formerly enslaved, in Africa. This was because they faced racial discrimination in the form of political disenfranchisement and the denial of civil, religious, and social rights. Formed in 1816, the American Colonization Society (ACS) was made up mostly of Quakers and slaveholders. Quakers believed black people would face better chances for freedom in Africa than in the U.S. While slaveholders opposed freedom for enslaved people, some viewed "repatriation" of free people of color as a way to avoid slave rebellions.

In 1822, the American Colonization Society began sending free people of color to the Pepper Coast voluntarily to establish a colony. Mortality from tropical diseases was high—of the 4,571 emigrants who arrived in Liberia between 1820 and 1843, only 1,819 survived. By 1867, the ACS (and state-related chapters) had assisted in the migration of more than 13,000 people of color from the United States and the Caribbean to Liberia. These free African Americans and their descendants married within their community and came to identify as Americo-Liberians. Many were of mixed race and educated in American culture; they did not identify with the indigenous natives of the tribes they encountered. They intermarried largely within the colonial community, developing an ethnic group that had a cultural tradition infused with American notions of political republicanism and Protestant Christianity.

The ACS, supported by prominent American politicians such as Abraham Lincoln, Henry Clay, and James Monroe, believed "repatriation" was preferable to having emancipated slaves remain in the United States. Similar state-based organizations established colonies in Mississippi-in-Africa, Kentucky in Africa, and the Republic of Maryland, which Liberia later annexed. However, Lincoln in 1862 described Liberia as only "in a certain sense...a success", and proposed instead that free people of color be assisted to emigrate to Chiriquí, today part of Panama.

The Americo-Liberian settlers did not relate well to the indigenous peoples they encountered, especially those in communities of the more isolated "bush". The colonial settlements were raided by the Kru and Grebo, from their inland chiefdoms. Encounters with tribal Africans in the bush often became violent. Believing themselves different from and culturally and educationally superior to the indigenous peoples, the Americo-Liberians developed as an elite minority that created and held on to political power. In a conscious effort to emulate the American South, the Americo-Liberian settlers adopted clothing such as hoop skirts and tailcoats, and excluded natives from economic opportunities, including creating plantations on which natives were forced to work as slaves. Indigenous tribesmen did not enjoy birthright citizenship in their own land until 1904. Americo-Liberians encouraged religious organizations to set up missions and schools to educate the indigenous peoples.

Political formation

On July 26, 1847, the settlers issued a Declaration of Independence and promulgated a constitution. Based on the political principles of the United States Constitution, it established the independent Republic of Liberia. On August 24, Liberia adopted its 11-striped national flag. The United Kingdom was the first country to recognize Liberia's independence. The United States did not recognize Liberia until 1862, after the Southern states, which had strong political power in the American government, declared their secession and the formation of the Confederacy.

The leadership of the new nation consisted largely of the Americo-Liberians, who initially established political and economic dominance in the coastal areas that the ACS had purchased; they maintained relations with U.S. contacts in developing these areas and the resulting trade. Their passage of the 1865 Ports of Entry Act prohibited foreign commerce with the inland tribes, ostensibly to "encourage the growth of civilized values" before such trade was allowed in the region. 

By 1877, the True Whig Party was the country's most powerful political entity. It was made up primarily of Americo-Liberians, who maintained social, economic and political dominance well into the 20th century, repeating patterns of European colonists in other nations in Africa. Competition for office was usually contained within the party; a party nomination virtually ensured election.

Pressure from the United Kingdom, which controlled Sierra Leone to the northwest, and France, with its interests in the north and east, led to a loss of Liberia's claims to extensive territories. Both Sierra Leone and the Ivory Coast annexed territories. Liberia struggled to attract investment to develop infrastructure and a larger, industrial economy.

There was a decline in production of Liberian goods in the late 19th century, and the government struggled financially, resulting in indebtedness on a series of international loans. On July 16, 1892, Martha Ann Erskine Ricks met Queen Victoria at Windsor Castle and presented her a handmade quilt, Liberia's first diplomatic gift. Born into slavery in Tennessee, Ricks said, "I had heard it often, from the time I was a child, how good the Queen had been to my people—to slaves—and how she wanted us to be free."

Early 20th century

American and other international interests emphasized resource extraction, with rubber production a major industry in the early 20th century. In 1914, Imperial Germany accounted for three quarters of the trade of Liberia. This was a cause for concern among the British colonial authorities of Sierra Leone and the French colonial authorities of French Guinea and the Ivory Coast as tensions with Germany increased.

World Wars and interwar period

Liberia remained neutral during World War I until August 4, 1917, upon declaring war on Germany. Subsequently, it was one of 32 nations to take part in the Versailles Peace Conference in 1919, which ended the war and established the League of Nations; Liberia was among the few African and non-Western nations to participate in both the conference and the founding of the League.

In 1927, the country's elections again showed the power of the True Whig Party, with electoral proceedings that have been called some of the most rigged ever; the winning candidate was declared to have received votes amounting to more than 15 times the number of eligible voters. (The loser actually received around 60% of the eligible vote.)

Soon after, allegations of modern slavery in Liberia led the League of Nations to establish the Christy commission. Findings included government involvement in widespread "Forced or compulsory labour". Minority ethnic groups especially were exploited in a system that enriched well-connected elites. As a result of the report, President Charles D. B. King and Vice President Allen N. Yancy resigned.

In the mid-20th century, Liberia gradually began to modernize with American assistance. During World War II, the United States made major infrastructure improvements to support its military efforts in Africa and Europe against Germany. It built the Freeport of Monrovia and Roberts International Airport under the Lend-Lease program before its entry into the Second World War.

After the war, President William Tubman encouraged foreign investment, with Liberia achieving the second-highest rate of economic growth in the world during the 1950s. In international affairs, it was a founding member of the United Nations, a vocal critic of South African apartheid, a proponent of African independence from European colonial powers, and a supporter of Pan-Africanism. Liberia also helped to fund the Organisation of African Unity.

Late 20th-century political instability
On April 12, 1980, a military coup led by Master Sergeant Samuel Doe of the Krahn ethnic group overthrew and killed President William R. Tolbert Jr. Doe and the other plotters later executed a majority of Tolbert's cabinet and other Americo-Liberian government officials and True Whig Party members. The coup leaders formed the People's Redemption Council (PRC) to govern the country. A strategic Cold War ally of the West, Doe received significant financial backing from the United States while critics condemned the PRC for corruption and political repression.

After Liberia adopted a new constitution in 1985, Doe was elected president in subsequent elections that were internationally condemned as fraudulent. On November 12, 1985, a failed counter-coup was launched by Thomas Quiwonkpa, whose soldiers briefly occupied the national radio station. Government repression intensified in response, as Doe's troops retaliated by executing members of the Gio and Mano ethnic groups in Nimba County.

The National Patriotic Front of Liberia (NPFL), a rebel group led by Charles Taylor, launched an insurrection in December 1989 against Doe's government with the backing of neighboring countries such as Burkina Faso and Ivory Coast. This triggered the First Liberian Civil War. By September 1990, Doe's forces controlled only a small area just outside the capital, and Doe was captured and executed in that month by rebel forces.

The rebels soon split into various factions fighting one another. The Economic Community Monitoring Group under the Economic Community of West African States organized a military task force to intervene in the crisis. From 1989 to 1997 around 60,000 to 80,000 Liberians died, and, by 1996, around 700,000 others had been displaced into refugee camps in neighboring countries. A peace deal between warring parties was reached in 1995, leading to Taylor's election as president in 1997.

Under Taylor's leadership, Liberia became internationally known as a pariah state due to its use of blood diamonds and illegal timber exports to fund the Revolutionary United Front in the Sierra Leone Civil War. The Second Liberian Civil War began in 1999 when Liberians United for Reconciliation and Democracy, a rebel group based in the northwest of the country, launched an armed insurrection against Taylor.

21st century
In March 2003, a second rebel group, Movement for Democracy in Liberia, began launching attacks against Taylor from the southeast. Peace talks between the factions began in Accra in June of that year, and Taylor was indicted by the Special Court for Sierra Leone for crimes against humanity the same month. By July 2003, the rebels had launched an assault on Monrovia.
Under heavy pressure from the international community and the domestic Women of Liberia Mass Action for Peace movement,
Taylor resigned in August 2003 and went into exile in Nigeria.
A peace deal was signed later that month.

The United Nations Mission in Liberia began arriving in September 2003 to provide security and monitor the peace accord,
and an interim government took power the following October.
The subsequent 2005 elections were internationally regarded as the freest and fairest in Liberian history. Ellen Johnson Sirleaf, a US-educated economist, former Minister of Finance and future Nobel Prize for Peace winner, was elected as the first female president in Africa. Upon her inauguration, Sirleaf requested the extradition of Taylor from Nigeria and transferred him to the SCSL for trial in The Hague.

In 2006, the government established a Truth and Reconciliation Commission to address the causes and crimes of the civil war. In 2011, July 26 was proclaimed by President Ellen Johnson Sirleaf to be observed as National Independence Day. In October 2011, peace activist Leymah Gbowee received the Nobel Peace Prize in her work of leading a women's peace movement that brought to an end to the Second Liberian Civil War in 2003. In November 2011, President Ellen Johnson Sirleaf was re-elected for a second six-year term.

Following the 2017 Liberian general election, former professional football striker George Weah, one of the greatest African players of all time, was sworn in as president on January 22, 2018, becoming the fourth youngest serving president in Africa. The inauguration marked Liberia's first fully democratic transition in 74 years. Weah cited fighting corruption, reforming the economy, combating illiteracy, and improving living conditions as the main targets of his presidency.

Geography

Liberia is situated in West Africa, bordering the North Atlantic Ocean to the country's southwest. It lies between latitudes 4° and 9°N, and longitudes 7° and 12°W.

The landscape is characterized by mostly flat to rolling coastal plains that contain mangroves and swamps, which rise to a rolling plateau and low mountains in the northeast.

Tropical rainforests cover the hills, while elephant grass and semi-deciduous forests make up the dominant vegetation in the northern sections.

Liberia's watershed tends to move in a southwestern pattern towards the sea as new rains move down the forested plateau off the inland mountain range of Guinée Forestière, in Guinea. Cape Mount near the border with Sierra Leone receives the most precipitation in the nation.

Liberia's main northwestern boundary is traversed by the Mano River while its southeast limits are bounded by the Cavalla River. Liberia's three largest rivers are St. Paul exiting near Monrovia, the river St. John at Buchanan, and the Cestos River, all of which flow into the Atlantic.

Climate 

The equatorial climate, in the south of the country, is hot year-round with heavy rainfall from May to October with a short interlude in mid-July to August. During the winter months of November to March, dry dust-laden harmattan winds blow inland, causing many problems for residents. Climate change in Liberia causes many problems as Liberia is particularly vulnerable to climate change. Like many other countries in Africa, Liberia both faces existing environmental issues, as well as sustainable development challenges. Because of its location in Africa, it is vulnerable to extreme weather, the coastal effects of sea level rise, and changing water systems and water availability. Climate change is expected to severely impact the economy of Liberia, especially agriculture, fisheries, and forestry. Liberia has been an active participant in international and local policy changes related to climate change.

Biodiversity and conservation

Forests on the coastline are composed mostly of salt-tolerant mangrove trees, while the more sparsely populated inland has forests opening onto a plateau of drier grasslands. The climate is equatorial, with significant rainfall during the May–October rainy season and harsh harmattan winds the remainder of the year. Liberia possesses about forty percent of the remaining Upper Guinean rainforest. It was an important producer of rubber in the early 20th century. Four terrestrial ecoregions lie within Liberia's borders: Guinean montane forests, Western Guinean lowland forests, Guinean forest–savanna mosaic, and Guinean mangroves. It had a 2019 Forest Landscape Integrity Index mean score of 4.79/10, ranking it 116th globally out of 172 countries.

Liberia is a global biodiversity hotspot—a significant reservoir of biodiversity that is under threat from humans.

Endangered species are hunted for human consumption as bushmeat in Liberia. Species hunted for food in Liberia include elephants, pygmy hippopotamus, chimpanzees, leopards, duikers, and other monkeys. Bushmeat is often exported to neighboring Sierra Leone and Ivory Coast, despite a ban on the cross-border sale of wild animals.

Bushmeat is widely eaten in Liberia, and is considered a delicacy. A 2004 public opinion survey found that bushmeat ranked second behind fish amongst residents of the capital Monrovia as a preferred source of protein. Of households where bushmeat was served, 80% of residents said they cooked it "once in a while," while 13% cooked it once a week and 7% cooked bushmeat daily. The survey was conducted during the last civil war, and bushmeat consumption is now believed to be far higher.

Trypanosoma brucei gambiense is endemic in some animal hosts here including both domestic and wild. This causes the disease nagana. In pigs here and in Ivory Coast, that includes Tbg group 1. Tbg and its vector Glossina palpalis gambiense are a constant presence in the rainforests here. Much research into Tbg was performed in the 1970s by Mehlitz and by Gibson, both working in Bong Mine with samples from around the country. The West African pariah dog is also a host for Tbg.

The Desert Locust (Schistocerca gregaria) is a constant presence here.

The Hairy Slit-Faced Bat (Nycteris hispida) suffers from malaria here.

Slash-and-burn agriculture is one of the human activities eroding Liberia's natural forests. A 2004 UN report estimated that 99% of Liberians burned charcoal and fuel wood for cooking and heating, resulting in deforestation.

Illegal logging has increased in Liberia since the end of the Second Civil War in 2003. In 2012, President Sirleaf granted licenses to companies to cut down 58% of all the primary rainforest left in Liberia. After international protests, many of those logging permits were canceled. In September 2014, Liberia and Norway struck an agreement whereby Liberia ceased all logging in exchange for $150 million in development aid.

Pollution is a significant issue in Monrovia. Since 2006, the international community has paid for all garbage collection and disposal in Monrovia via the World Bank.

Administrative divisions

Liberia is divided into fifteen counties, which, in turn, are subdivided into a total of 90 districts and further subdivided into clans. The oldest counties are Grand Bassa and Montserrado, both founded in 1839 prior to Liberian independence. Gbarpolu is the newest county, created in 2001. Montserrado is also the most populous county with 1,144,806 residents as of the 2008 census.

The fifteen counties are administered by superintendents appointed by the president. The Constitution calls for the election of various chiefs at the county and local level, but these elections have not taken place since 1985 due to war and financial constraints.

Parallel to the administrative divisions of the country are the local and municipal divisions. Liberia currently does not have any constitutional framework or uniform statutes which deal with the creation or revocation of local governments. All existing local governments—cities, townships, and a borough—were created by specific acts of the Liberian government, and thus the structure and duties/responsibilities of each local government varies greatly from one to the other.

Government and politics 

The government of Liberia, modeled on the government of the United States, is a unitary constitutional republic and representative democracy as established by the Constitution. The government has three co-equal branches of government: the executive, headed by the president; the legislative, consisting of the bicameral Legislature of Liberia; and the judicial, consisting of the Supreme Court and several lower courts.

The president serves as head of government, head of state, and the commander-in-chief of the Armed Forces of Liberia. Among the president's other duties are to sign or veto legislative bills, grant pardons, and appoint Cabinet members, judges, and other public officials. Together with the vice president, the president is elected to a six-year term by majority vote in a two-round system and can serve up to two terms in office.

The Legislature is composed of the Senate and the House of Representatives. The House, led by a speaker, has 73 members apportioned among the 15 counties on the basis of the national census, with each county receiving a minimum of two members. Each House member represents an electoral district within a county as drawn by the National Elections Commission and is elected by a plurality of the popular vote of their district into a six-year term. The Senate is made up of two senators from each county for a total of 30 senators. Senators serve nine-year terms and are elected at-large by a plurality of the popular vote. The vice president serves as the President of the Senate, with a President pro tempore serving in their absence.

Liberia's highest judicial authority is the Supreme Court, made up of five members and headed by the Chief Justice of Liberia. Members are nominated to the court by the president and are confirmed by the Senate, serving until the age of 70. The judiciary is further divided into circuit and speciality courts, magistrate courts and justices of the peace. The judicial system is a blend of common law, based on Anglo-American law, and customary law. An informal system of traditional courts still exists within the rural areas of the country, with trial by ordeal remaining common despite being officially outlawed.

From 1877 to 1980, the government was dominated by the True Whig Party. Today, over 20 political parties are registered in the country, based largely around personalities and ethnic groups. Most parties suffer from poor organizational capacity. The 2005 elections marked the first time that the president's party did not gain a majority of seats in the Legislature.

Military

The Armed Forces of Liberia (AFL) are the country's armed forces. Founded as the Liberian Frontier Force in 1908, the military was renamed in 1956. For virtually all of its history, the AFL has received considerable material and training assistance from the United States. For most of the 1941–89 period, training was largely provided by U.S. advisors, with combat experience in the Second World War also playing a role in training. After UN Security Council Resolution 1509 in September 2003, the United Nations Mission in Liberia arrived to referee the ceasefire with units from Ghana, Nigeria, Pakistan, and China with the view to assist the National Transitional Government of Liberia in forming the new Liberian military.

Foreign relations

After the turmoil following the First and Second Liberian Civil Wars, Liberia's internal stabilization in the 21st century brought a return to cordial relations with neighboring countries and much of the Western world. As in other African countries, China is an important part of the post-conflict reconstruction.

In the past, both of Liberia's neighbors, Guinea and Sierra Leone, have accused Liberia of backing rebels in their countries.

Law enforcement and crime

The Liberian National Police is the country's national police force. As of October 2007 it has 844 officers in 33 stations in Montserrado County, which contains Monrovia. The National Police Training Academy is in Paynesville City. A history of corruption among police officers diminishes public trust and operational effectiveness. The internal security is characterized by a general lawlessness coupled with the danger that former combatants in the late civil war might reestablish militias to challenge the civil authorities.

Rape and sexual assault are frequent in the post-conflict era in Liberia. Liberia has one of the highest incidences of sexual violence against women in the world. Rape is the most frequently reported crime, accounting for more than one-third of sexual violence cases. Adolescent girls are the most frequently assaulted, and almost 40% of perpetrators are adult men known to victims.

Both male and female homosexuality are illegal in Liberia. On July 20, 2012, the Liberian senate voted unanimously to enact legislation to prohibit and criminalize same-sex marriages.

Corruption

Corruption is endemic at every level of the Liberian government. When President Sirleaf took office in 2006, she announced that corruption was "the major public enemy." In 2014, the US ambassador to Liberia said that corruption there was harming people through "unnecessary costs to products and services that are already difficult for many Liberians to afford".

Liberia scored a 3.3 on a scale from 10 (highly clean) to 0 (highly corrupt) on the 2010 Corruption Perceptions Index. This gave it a ranking 87th of 178 countries worldwide and 11th of 47 in Sub-Saharan Africa. This score represented a significant improvement since 2007, when the country scored 2.1 and ranked 150th of 180 countries. When dealing with public-facing government functionaries, 89% of Liberians say they have had to pay a bribe, the highest national percentage in the world according to the organization's 2010 Global Corruption Barometer.

Economy

The Central Bank of Liberia is responsible for printing and maintaining the Liberian dollar, Liberia's primary currency (the United States dollar is also legal tender in Liberia). Liberia is one of the world's poorest countries, with a formal employment rate of 15%. GDP per capita peaked in 1980 at US$496, when it was comparable to Egypt's (at the time). In 2011, the country's nominal GDP was US$1.154 billion, while nominal GDP per capita stood at US$297, the third-lowest in the world. Historically the Liberian economy has depended heavily on foreign aid, foreign direct investment and exports of natural resources such as iron ore, rubber, and timber.

Economic history 
Following a peak in growth in 1979, the Liberian economy began a steady decline due to economic mismanagement after the 1980 coup. This decline was accelerated by the outbreak of civil war in 1989; GDP was reduced by an estimated 90% between 1989 and 1995, one of the fastest declines in modern history. Upon the end of the war in 2003, GDP growth began to accelerate, reaching 9.4% in 2007. The global financial crisis slowed GDP growth to 4.6% in 2009, though a strengthening agricultural sector led by rubber and timber exports increased growth to 5.1% in 2010 and an expected 7.3% in 2011, making the economy one of the 20 fastest-growing in the world.

Current impediments to growth include a small domestic market, lack of adequate infrastructure, high transportation costs, poor trade links with neighboring countries and the high dollarization of the economy. Liberia used the United States dollar as its currency from 1943 until 1982 and continues to use the U.S. dollar alongside the Liberian dollar.

Following a decrease in inflation beginning in 2003, inflation spiked in 2008 as a result of worldwide food and energy crises, reaching 17.5% before declining to 7.4% in 2009. Liberia's external debt was estimated in 2006 at approximately $4.5 billion, 800% of GDP. As a result of bilateral, multilateral and commercial debt relief from 2007 to 2010, the country's external debt fell to $222.9 million by 2011.

While official commodity exports declined during the 1990s as many investors fled the civil war, Liberia's wartime economy featured the exploitation of the region's diamond wealth. The country acted as a major trader in Sierra Leonian blood diamonds, exporting over US$300 million in diamonds in 1999. This led to a United Nations ban on Liberian diamond exports in 2001, which was lifted in 2007 following Liberia's accession to the Kimberley Process Certification Scheme.

In 2003, additional UN sanctions were placed on Liberian timber exports, which had risen from US$5 million in 1997 to over US$100 million in 2002 and were believed to be funding rebels in Sierra Leone. These sanctions were lifted in 2006. Due in large part to foreign aid and investment inflow following the end of the war, Liberia maintains a large account deficit, which peaked at nearly 60% in 2008. Liberia gained observer status with the World Trade Organization in 2010 and became an official member in 2016.

Liberia has the highest ratio of foreign direct investment to GDP in the world, with US$16 billion in investment since 2006. Following Sirleaf's inauguration in 2006, Liberia signed several multi-billion-dollar concession agreements in the iron ore and palm oil industries with numerous multinational corporations, including ArcelorMittal, BHP and Sime Darby. Palm oil companies like Sime Darby (Malaysia) and Golden Veroleum (USA) have been accused of destroying livelihoods and displacing local communities, enabled by government concessions. Since 1926 Firestone has operated the world's largest rubber plantation in Harbel, Margibi County. As of 2015, it had more than 8,000 mostly Liberian employees, making it the country's largest private employer.

Shipping flag of convenience
Due to its status as a flag of convenience, Liberia has the second-largest maritime registry in the world behind Panama. It has 3,500 vessels registered under its flag, accounting for 11% of ships worldwide.

Major industries

Agriculture

Mining

Telecommunications 

There are six major newspapers in Liberia, and 65% of the population has a mobile phone service.
Much of Liberia's communications infrastructure was destroyed or plundered during the two civil wars (1989–1996 and 1999–2003). With low rates of adult literacy and high poverty rates, television and newspaper use is limited, leaving radio as the predominant means of communicating with the public.

Transportation

Energy

Public electricity services are provided solely by the state-owned Liberia Electricity Corporation, which operates a small grid almost exclusively in the Greater Monrovia District. The vast majority of electric energy services is provided by small, privately owned generators. At $0.54 per kWh, the cost of electricity in Liberia is among the highest in the world. Total capacity in 2013 was 20 MW, a sharp decline from a peak of 191 MW in 1989 before the wars.

The repair and expansion of the Mount Coffee Hydropower Project, with a maximum capacity of 80 MW, was completed in 2018. Construction of three new heavy fuel oil power plants is expected to boost electrical capacity by 38 MW. In 2013, Liberia began importing power from neighboring Ivory Coast and Guinea through the West African Power Pool.

Liberia has begun exploration for offshore oil; unproven oil reserves may be in excess of one billion barrels. The government divided its offshore waters into 17 blocks and began auctioning off exploration licenses for the blocks in 2004, with further auctions in 2007 and 2009. An additional 13 ultra-deep offshore blocks were demarcated in 2011 and planned for auction. Among the companies to have won licenses are Repsol YPF, Chevron Corporation, and Woodside Petroleum.

Demographics

As of the 2017 national census, Liberia was home to 4,694,608 people. Of those, 1,118,241 lived in Montserrado County, the most populous county in the country and home to the capital of Monrovia. The Greater Monrovia District has 970,824 residents. Nimba County is the next most populous county, with 462,026 residents. As revealed in the 2008 census, Monrovia is more than four times more populous than all the county capitals combined.

Prior to the 2008 census, the last census had been taken in 1984 and listed the country's population as 2,101,628. The population of Liberia was 1,016,443 in 1962 and increased to 1,503,368 in 1974. , Liberia had the highest population growth rate in the world (4.50% per annum). In 2010 some 43.5% of Liberians were below the age of 15.

Ethnic groups

The population includes 16 indigenous ethnic groups and various foreign minorities. Indigenous peoples comprise about 95 percent of the population. The 16 officially recognized ethnic groups include the Kpelle, Bassa, Mano, Gio or Dan, Kru, Grebo, Krahn, Vai, Gola, Mandingo or Mandinka, Mende, Kissi, Gbandi, Loma, Dei or Dewoin, Belleh, and Americo-Liberians or Congo people (so named because many immigrants including those freed from slave ships arrived from ports at the mouth of the Congo River).

The Kpelle comprise more than 20% of the population and are the largest ethnic group in Liberia, residing mostly in Bong County and adjacent areas in central Liberia. Americo-Liberians, who are descendants of African American and West Indian, mostly Barbadian (Bajan) settlers, make up 2.5%. Congo people, descendants of repatriated Congo and Afro-Caribbean slaves who arrived in 1825, make up an estimated 2.5%.  These latter two groups established political control in the 19th century which they kept well into the 20th century.

The Liberian constitution exercises jus sanguinis, which means it usually restricts its citizenship to "Negroes or persons of Negro descent." That being said, numerous immigrants have come as merchants and become a major part of the business community, including Lebanese, Indians, and other West African nationals. There is a high percentage of interracial marriage between ethnic Liberians and the Lebanese, resulting in a significant mixed-race population especially in and around Monrovia. A small minority of Liberians who are White Africans of European descent reside in the country.

Languages

English is the official language and serves as the lingua franca of Liberia. As of 2022, 27 indigenous languages are spoken in Liberia, but each is a first language for only a small percentage of the population. Liberians also speak a variety of creolized dialects collectively known as Liberian English.

Largest cities

Religion

According to the 2008 National Census, 85.6% of the population practiced Christianity, while Muslims represented a minority of 12.2%. A multitude of diverse Protestant confessions such as Lutheran, Baptist, Episcopal, Presbyterian, Pentecostal, United Methodist, African Methodist Episcopal (AME) and African Methodist Episcopal Zion (AME Zion) denominations form the bulk of the Christian population, followed by adherents of the Catholic Church and other non-Protestant Christians. Most of these Christian denominations were brought by African-American settlers moving from the United States into Liberia via the American Colonization Society, while some are indigenous—especially Pentecostal and evangelical Protestant ones. Protestantism was originally associated with Black American settlers and their Americo-Liberian descendants, while native peoples initially held to their own animist forms of African traditional religion before largely adopting Christianity. While Christian, many Liberians also participate in traditional, gender-based indigenous religious secret societies, such as Poro for men and Sande for women. The all-female Sande society practices female circumcision.

Muslims comprised 12.2% of the population in 2008, largely represented by the Mandingo and Vai ethnic groups. Liberian Muslims are divided between Sunnis, Shias, Ahmadiyyas, Sufis, and non-denominational Muslims.

In 2008, 0.5% identified adherence to traditional indigenous religions, while 1.5% claimed no religion. A small number of people were Baháʼí, Hindu, Sikh, or Buddhist.

The Liberian constitution provides for freedom of religion, and the government generally respects this right. While separation of church and state is mandated by the Constitution, Liberia is considered a Christian state in practice. Public schools offer biblical studies, though parents may opt their children out. Commerce is prohibited by law on Sunday and major Christian holidays. The government does not require businesses or schools to excuse Muslims for Friday prayers.

Education

In 2010, the literacy rate of Liberia was estimated at 60.8% (64.8% for males and 56.8% for females). In some areas primary and secondary education is free and compulsory from the ages of 6 to 16, though enforcement of attendance is lax. In other areas children are required to pay a tuition fee to attend school. On average, children attain 10 years of education (11 for boys and 8 for girls). The country's education sector is hampered by inadequate schools and supplies, as well as a lack of qualified teachers.

Higher education is provided by a number of public and private universities. The University of Liberia is the country's largest and oldest university. Located in Monrovia, the university opened in 1862. Today it has six colleges, including a medical school and the nation's only law school, Louis Arthur Grimes School of Law.

In 2009, Tubman University in Harper, Maryland County was established as the second public university in Liberia. Since 2006, the government has also opened community colleges in Buchanan, Sanniquellie, and Voinjama.

Due to student protests late in October 2018, newly elected president George M. Weah abolished tuition fees for undergraduate students in the public universities in Liberia.

Private universities
 Cuttington University was established by the Episcopal Church of the USA in 1889 in Suakoko, Bong County, as part of its missionary education work among indigenous peoples. It is the nation's oldest private university.
 Stella Maris Polytechnic, a post-secondary, private institution of higher learning. Founded in 1988, the school is owned and operated by the Roman Catholic Archdiocese of Monrovia. Located on Capitol Hill, the school has approximately 2,000 students.
 Adventist University of West Africa, a post-secondary learning environment that is situated in Margibi County, on the Roberts International Airport.
 United Methodist University, a private Christian university located in Liberia, West Africa, it is commonly known amongst locals as UMU. As of 2016, it had approximately 9,118 students. This institution was founded in 1998.
 African Methodist Episcopal University, a private higher education institution that was founded in 1995.
 Starz University, is a private higher education institution that was established in the United States in 2007, and became incorporated in Monrovia, 2009; with the objective of addressing the Information Technology(IT) need of Liberia.
 St. Clements University College (Liberia), a private higher education institution that was founded in 2008.

Health 

Hospitals in Liberia include the John F. Kennedy Medical Center in Monrovia and several others. Life expectancy in Liberia is estimated to be 64.4 years in 2020. With a fertility rate of 5.9 births per woman, the maternal mortality rate stood at 990 per 100,000 births in 2010, and 1,072 per 100,000 births in 2017. A number of highly communicable diseases are widespread, including tuberculosis, diarrheal diseases and malaria. In 2007, the HIV infection rates stood at 2% of the population aged 15–49 whereas the incidence of tuberculosis was 420 per 100,000 people in 2008. Approximately 58.2% – 66% of women are estimated to have undergone female genital mutilation.

Liberia imports 90% of its rice, a staple food, and is extremely vulnerable to food shortages. In 2007, 20.4% of children under the age of five were malnourished. In 2008, only 17% of the population had access to adequate sanitation facilities.

Approximately 95% of the country's healthcare facilities had been destroyed by the time civil war ended in 2003. In 2009, government expenditure on health care per capita was US$22, accounting for 10.6% of total GDP. In 2008, Liberia had only one doctor and 27 nurses per 100,000 people.

In 2014, an outbreak of Ebola virus in Guinea spread to Liberia. , there were 2,812 confirmed deaths from the ongoing outbreak. In early August 2014 Guinea closed its borders to Liberia to help contain the spread of the virus, as more new cases were being reported in Liberia than in Guinea. On May 9, 2015, Liberia was declared Ebola free after six weeks with no new cases.

According to an Overseas Development Institute report, private health expenditure accounts for 64.1% of total spending on health.

Culture

The religious practices, social customs and cultural standards of the Americo-Liberians had their roots in the antebellum American South. The settlers wore top hat and tails and modeled their homes on those of Southern slaveowners. Most Americo-Liberian men were members of the Masonic Order of Liberia, which became heavily involved in the nation's politics.

Liberia has a rich history in textile arts and quilting, as the settlers brought with them their sewing and quilting skills. Liberia hosted National Fairs in 1857 and 1858 in which prizes were awarded for various needle arts. One of the most well-known Liberian quilters was Martha Ann Ricks, who presented a quilt featuring the famed Liberian coffee tree to Queen Victoria in 1892. When President Ellen Johnson Sirleaf moved into the Executive Mansion, she reportedly had a Liberian-made quilt installed in her presidential office.

A rich literary tradition has existed in Liberia for over a century. Edward Wilmot Blyden, Bai T. Moore, Roland T. Dempster and Wilton G. S. Sankawulo are among Liberia's more prominent authors. Moore's novella Murder in the Cassava Patch is considered Liberia's most celebrated novel.

Polygamy

One-third of married Liberian women between the ages of 15–49 are in polygamous marriages. Customary law allows men to have up to four wives.

Cuisine

Liberian cuisine heavily incorporates rice, the country's staple food. Other ingredients include cassava, fish, bananas, citrus fruit, plantains, coconut, okra and sweet potatoes. Heavy stews spiced with habanero and scotch bonnet chilies are popular and eaten with fufu. Liberia also has a tradition of baking imported from the United States that is unique in West Africa.

Sport
The most popular sport in Liberia is association football, with President George Weah—the only African to be named FIFA World Player of the Year—being the nation's most famous athlete. The Liberia national football team has reached the Africa Cup of Nations finals twice, in 1996 and 2002.

The second most popular sport in Liberia is basketball. The Liberian national basketball team has reached the AfroBasket twice, in 1983 and 2007.

In Liberia, the Samuel Kanyon Doe Sports Complex serves as a multi-purpose stadium. It hosts FIFA World Cup qualifying matches in addition to international concerts and national political events.

Measurement system
Liberia has not yet completely adopted the International System of Units (abbreviated as the SI, also called the metric system). The 1988 Omnibus Foreign Trade and Competitiveness Act designated the metric system as "the preferred system of weights and measures for United States trade and commerce," but in practice the system is in mixed usage, with the population generally preferring customary units and industries either fully metric or mixed.

The Liberian government has begun transitioning away from use of United States customary units to the metric system. However, this change has been gradual, with government reports concurrently using both United States Customary and metric units. In 2018, the Liberian Commerce and Industry Minister announced that the Liberian government is committed to adopting the metric system.

See also

 Outline of Liberia
 Gender inequality in Liberia

References

Further reading

 Cooper, Helene, House at Sugar Beach: In Search of a Lost African Childhood (Simon & Schuster, 2008)
 
 
 
 
 
 
 Lang, Victoria, To Liberia: Destiny's Timing (Publish America, Baltimore, 2004). Novel of the journey of a young Black couple fleeing America to settle in the African motherland of Liberia.
 Maksik, Alexander, A Marker to Measure Drift (John Murray 2013; Paperback 2014). A novel about a young woman's experience of and escape from the Liberian civil war.
 
 Mwakikagile, Godfrey, Military Coups in West Africa Since The Sixties, Chapter Eight: Liberia: 'The Love of Liberty Brought Us Here,' pp. 85–110, Nova Science Publishers, Inc., Huntington, New York, 2001; Godfrey Mwakikagile, The Modern African State: Quest for Transformation, Chapter One: The Collapse of A Modern African State: Death and Rebirth of Liberia, pp. 1–18, Nova Science Publishers, Inc., 2001.
 
 Sankawulo, Wilton, Great Tales of Liberia. Dr. Sankawulo is the compiler of these tales from Liberia and about Liberian culture. Editura Universității "Lucian Blaga", Sibiu, Romania, 2004. .
 Sankawulo, Wilton, Sundown at Dawn: A Liberian Odyssey. Recommended by the Cultural Resource Center, Center for Applied Linguistics for its content concerning Liberian culture. 
 Shaw, Elma, Redemption Road: The Quest for Peace and Justice in Liberia (a novel), with a foreword by President Ellen Johnson Sirleaf (Cotton Tree Press, 2008)

External links

 Chief of State and Cabinet Members 
 Liberia. The World Factbook. Central Intelligence Agency.
 Liberia from UCB Libraries GovPubs.
 
 Liberia profile from the BBC News.
 Liberia profile from the African Studies Centre Leiden Country portal.
 "Liberia Maps", Perry–Castañeda Library, University of Texas at Austin.
 

 
Economic Community of West African States
English-speaking countries and territories
Least developed countries
Member states of the African Union
Republics
States and territories established in 1847
Member states of the United Nations
West African countries
 
Countries in Africa
American colonization movement